Dunia Eicak is a Malaysian animated series produced by Addeen Multimedia.  The show's plot centers on a boy, nicknamed Eicak, who discovers 'friends' in the most unexpected world. Dunia Eicak is a 3D animation series about appreciating friends, practicing good values, even when sometimes all you really want to do is run away.

The series was published in the HDTV format and was broadcast over TV3 beginning in June 2012, and on Nickelodeon beginning in March 2013.

Production 
Dunia Eicak is the first product of Addeen Multimedia Sdn. Bhd., an animation company established by Azman Azahar with one other partner. Addeen Multimedia operated in Cyberjaya since 2011.

The series was released in Malay version and then in English version for the local and international market, respectively. Both versions fully utilises the different voice actors.

Characters 

2012 Malaysian television series debuts
2012 Malaysian television series endings
Animated television series about children
Malaysian children's animated adventure television series
Malaysian children's animated comedy television series